François-Nicolas Martinet (1731 - 1800) was a French engineer, engraver and naturalist.

Martinet engraved  the plates for numerous works on natural history, especially ornithology. Notable in particular are those for l'Ornithologia, sive Synopsis methodica of Mathurin Jacques Brisson (1760–63).

References
 L'Histoire des oiseaux, peints dans leurs aspects apparents et sensibles, éd. originale conservée en un unique exemplaire au Trinity College d'Hartford. Nouvelle édition par le Bibliothèque des introuvables, avec les 208 gravures, 450 pages avec le texte originale et des commentaires d'Antoine Reille, ancien producteur de l'émission Les Animaux du Monde.

External links
Smithsonian Library: François-Nicolas Martinet

1731 births
1800 deaths
French ornithologists